Glenvale Transport (GTL) was a bus company that operated services in Liverpool between July 2001 and July 2005.

Overview 
In 2003, Glenvale transport controlled 30% of the Liverpool regional bus market. It was operating a fleet of 330 buses and employed 880 people. It made £17 Millions in annual revenues.

History
During the privatisation of the National Bus Company, North Western Road Car Company was sold to the Drawlane Group, which was restructured in 1992 as British Bus. On 1 August 1996 British Bus was purchased by the Cowie Group and in 1997 was rebranded as Arriva.

North Western expanded by purchasing substantial parts of the former Crosville Motor Services operations and acquired or created other companies - most notably Amberline, City Plus and Liverline in Liverpool, Beeline Buzz Company and Star Line Travel in Greater Manchester, Dee Line, Leigh Line, Little White Buses in West Lancashire, Runcorn Busways, South Lancashire Transport in St Helens, Warrington Gold Line and Wigan Bus.

By 2000, Arriva North West & Wales (as North Western had become) had built up a substantial presence in many parts of Merseyside, Cheshire, Greater Manchester and West Lancashire. In February 2000, Merseyside's largest bus operator MTL Trust Holdings was purchased by Arriva.
The acquisition and subsequent merger of the former MTL companies into Arriva North West gave Arriva a dominant position on Merseyside and in Liverpool in particular. A condition of the sale was that Arriva dispose of the MTL Gillmoss garage.

The bus corridors of South/East Liverpool were lucrative and had experienced more competition than those to the North of Liverpool and it was Liverpool's Gillmoss depot on the East Lancashire Road that Arriva offered for sale. The sale of Gillmoss, however, would turn out to be a rather protracted process. Its most profitable routes - 12/13 (Stockbridge Village Circular - Liverpool), 14 (Croxteth - Liverpool) and 53/55 (Thornton/Old Roan - Liverpool) were allowed to remain with Arriva Merseyside/North West and were transferred to its Green Lane and Bootle garages. It is unknown whether this deterred prospective buyers but an early buyer did emerge in the form of Go-Ahead Group who considered Gillmoss as similar to its Go North East operation and therefore almost came to an agreement to buy Gillmoss in 2001. However at the 11th hour, Go-Ahead pulled out of the deal.

Arriva was having difficulty selling Gillmoss and put a proposal to the Competition Commission to re-invest in Gillmoss if it were allowed to keep the depot. The Competition Commission refused and the search for a buyer continued. In the Spring/Summer of 2001 a number of bids began to emerge. Merseyside's largest independent operator, CMT Buses, DelGro Corporation, Stagecoach and a management buyout fronted by ex-MTL managers Dominic Brady and Ian Campbell lodged bids. The latter was successful and Glenvale Transport took over from Arriva in July 2001.

Formation
The protracted sale of Gillmoss did lead to poor staff morale, compounded by Arriva using Gillmoss as a dumping ground for the remaining ex-London Buses Leyland Titans that Merseybus/MTL had been acquiring since the end of 1992. Gillmoss did have a modern fleet of 25 Northern Counties Palatine II bodied Volvo Olympians that Liverbus and Merseybus/MTL North had bought new between them in 1995 and 1998 respectively and had been dubbed The Millennium Fleet.

However GTL decided to not take up the leases for these buses and they remained with Arriva Merseyside who transferred them mostly to the Speke and Green Lane depots in Liverpool along with a handful for the Laird Street depot in Birkenhead. In return around 30 MCW Metrobuses which were more than 20 years old and had previously operated for Arriva Croydon & North Surrey and had been refurbished in 1999. MTL's cream and crimson livery was retained.

As a result of the Competition Commission's requirements Arriva North West & Wales couldn't compete on GTL's core route network in North Liverpool and Kirkby for three years and GTL decided to exploit this advantage: the next 18 months saw GTL rapidly expanding its route network throughout much of Merseyside. GTL promised investment in new vehicles for Gillmoss, however this never materialised.

Instead further ex-London vehicles in the form of another large batch of Leyland Titans, along with Reeve Burgess/Plaxton Pointer bodied Dennis Darts and a smaller batch of MCW Metrobuses (some of which briefly operated in the liveries of their former owners) were acquired and at its peak GTL acquired a fleet of around 120 Titans and 60 Metrobuses. GTL's newest vehicles in 2000 were a batch of 11 Marshall Capital bodied Dennis Dart SLFs - which were the last batch of vehicles to be purchased new by MTL in 1999, and eight 1997 East Lancs Spryte bodied Dennis Dart SLFs acquired secondhand from Speke-based Express Travel in 2002. Furthermore, these vehicles only usually operated Merseytravel contracts.

A significant amount of the GTL fleet was approaching 25 years of age and as GTL charged higher fares than Arriva Merseyside and CMT Buses, it gave GTL a more unfavourable impression in the eyes of Merseyside's bus users. In order to remain operating, GTL had to consolidate its position within Merseyside's bus market. The only remaining opportunity for GTL to do this was Aintree-based CMT Buses and it was perhaps unsurprising that GTL acquired CMT Buses.

CMT Buses

History

CMT Buses was a long established coach hire operator in the Merseyside area. After deregulation CMT, diversified into bus operation winning Merseytravel contracts and by the late-1980s had begun a commercial service network on the Wirral. Between 1991 and 1994 the company turned its focus to the Liverpool bus market which was already a hotbed of intense competition between Merseybus/MTL, City Fleet, Fareway, Liverline, Liverbus, Halton Transport, Merseyline, North Western, Village Group and GM Buses.

The coach hire and Wirral based services were discontinued and a significant number of new services on many of Liverpool's most lucrative bus corridors were started by CMT with a large fleet of Leyland Nationals. These were very successful and sparked a bus war in Liverpool which led to a period of consolidation in which MTL acquired Fareway, Liverbus and Village Group, North Western acquired Liverline, GM Buses withdrew from Merseyside and MTL, North Western, CMT Buses, GM Buses and Halton Transport entered into a controversial agreement which limited competition between these parties in the North West and fixed fares. A Competition Commission investigation which ruled this was illegal and fined the parties involved.

Despite this, CMT Buses was successful within the Merseyside bus market and from the summer of 1995 to the summer of 2002, it gradually began adding substantial numbers of new vehicles to its fleet including Wright Endurance bodied Volvo B10Bs, Wright Liberator bodied Volvo B10Ls, Wright Renown bodied Volvo B10BLEs and Northern Counties Paladin, Plaxton Pointer and Wright Crusader bodied Dennis Darts, along with relatively modern secondhand acquisitions including Alexander Strider bodied Volvo B10Bs from Blazefield owned Harrogate & District and Leyland Lynxes from a variety of sources to replace the aging Leyland Nationals.

Expansion
Towards the end of 1998, CMT acquired Formby based independent ABC Travel, which operated a substantial number of contracts for Merseytravel services and a modern fleet of mainly Optare products including MetroRiders, Deltas, Excels and Solos. Merseytravel contractor L&M Transport/Greenbus, in which it was rumoured CMT Buses had an interest, was integrated into CMT around 2001 and the operations centred upon the CMT base in Aintree. On 15 June 2003 GTL acquired the CMT operation, further consolidating GTL's position within the Merseyside bus market, expanding the fleet to approximately 290 vehicles and adding CMT's Aintree garage to that at Gillmoss.

Glenvale's expansion

The acquisition of CMT Buses enabled GTL to become Merseyside's second largest bus operator. Initially GTL kept CMT Buses as a separate entity, maintaining their all over bright red livery and yellow CMT Buses/liver bird logos along with CMT's route network, some of which duplicated those of GTL.

In October 2003, however, management of the Aintree depot was transferred over to GTL's management team and service network rationalised to co-ordinate with those of GTL. New blue 'GTL' logos were applied to the CMT vehicles and GTL adopted a darker all-red livery to replace the ex-MTL cream/crimson livery. There was again talk of investment in new vehicles along with possible expansion on Merseyside (opening a depot in the Speke area to compete directly with Arriva's South Liverpool services) and beyond.

Fleet investment
From late 2003 until spring 2005 approximately 94 Alexander Dash bodied Dennis Darts and Volvo B6s were purchased from Stagecoach, along with smaller batches of Wright Handybus bodied Dennis Darts from Go North East and Northern Counties Paladin bodied Dennis Darts from Metroline, ironically once part of the fleet at MTL London, were purchased. However these vehicles were 9–12 years old and not the new vehicles GTL had promised.

Arriva competition
By autumn 2004, the Competition Commission ban on Arriva competing against GTL in Kirkby and North Liverpool had expired. In response to significant expansion by GTL throughout Merseyside, Arriva registered high frequency copycat services over much of the GTL network in Kirkby and North Liverpool including 2 (Kirkby Northwood-Liverpool), 14A/B (Kirkby Tower Hill-Liverpool), 17 (Fazakerley Hospital-Liverpool), 19 (Fazakerley Lower Lane-Liverpool), 20 (Skelmersdale-Kirkby-Liverpool). These services mostly used modern low-floor vehicles and gave Arriva a competitive advantage over GTL's ageing fleet.

Merseytram competition 
Dominic Brady, chief executive of Glenvale Transport, saw the proposed Merseytram expansion plans as a treat to his company's business model. He believed the tram expansion was unneeded as his buses already served the market alongside the proposed tram route well. Brady warned that, if the tram was built, Glenvale would be forced to cut 250 jobs and dispose of 130 buses. In the end, the proposed tram line was not built before Glenvale's demise in 2005.

Decline
GTL never bought any new vehicles, despite promises on numerous occasions of significant reinvestment. Despite GTL's core routes in Kirkby and North Liverpool being considered as lucrative, profitable bus territory, GTL had an annual turnover of approximately £25m. Furthermore, levels of car ownership were relatively low, with significant declines in patronage.

By March 2005, GTL had run up debts of approximately £7m and was rumoured to be struggling to meet its financial commitments. GTL was therefore put on the market and sold to Stagecoach.

A final event of note for GTL was ex Stagecoach East Midlands Volvo B6/Alexander Dash (7282/L448LWE) had a starring role in the successful Liverpool Football Club's Champion's League homecoming on 26 May 2005. After becoming stranded in the vast crowd of people on Lime Street some Liverpool fans used 7282's roof as a vantage point to see Liverpool's open top bus parade in the city centre. Apart from a few small dents to the roof no damage was caused to the vehicle.

Trivia 
In August 2004, Glenvale Transport drivers were seen urinating in resident's gardens around 5:30 AM. They were caught in the act by CCTV cameras near Aintree station. Glenvale Transport issued a public apology on behalf of its drivers.

Fate 
On 13 July 2005, GTL was purchased by Stagecoach and rebranded as Stagecoach Merseyside, who implemented a fleet renewal programme.

References

External links

Flickr gallery

Historic transport in Merseyside
2001 establishments in England
2005 disestablishments in England
Former bus operators in Merseyside